Komiks Presents: Kapitan Boom is the first fantaserye offering in the Komiks series aired on ABS-CBN. This series is based on the comic strip Kapitan Boom by Mars Ravelo.

Plot
Lance Mercado has a secret superhero alter-ego: "Kapitan Boom". Lance's grandmother, Lola Gretchen (Gloria Sevilla), & his best friend, Bukol (Thou Reyes) are the only people who know about his abilities. During emergencies, Lance assumes another personality as Kapitan Boom (Jon Avila), the superhero dedicated to fighting the forces of evil.

Lance continues his normal life as a college student until he falls in love with a classmate, Melody (Maja Salvador). He struggles with his self-esteem issues to win her heart, but Melody already has her eyes set on Kapitan Boom. Melody eventually accepts Lance as a friend, but he may not be able to tell her that he is Kapitan Boom.

Cast and characters
Jay-R Siaboc as Lance Mercado (Kapitan Boom's alter-ego)
Maja Salvador as Melody - Kapitan Boom's/Lance's girlfriend
Jon Avila as Kapitan Boom
Thou Reyes as Bukol -  Lance/Kapitan Boom's best friend
Mariana Del Rio as Cheska - Melody's cousin
Isay Alvarez as Harmony -Melody's mother & Cheska's aunt
Gloria Sevilla  as Lola Gretchen - Lance/Kapitan Boom's grandma
Ana Capri as Rebecca "Becky" Mercado - Lance/Kapitan Boom's mother
Bembol Roco as Hector Dasmaquinoz
Marvin Raymundo as Tristan Ballesteros - Hector's assistant
Ina Raymundo    as  Queenie Romualdez - Hector's girlfriend
Jordan Castillo as Lapu-Lapu/Red
Railey Valoroso as Ichiro - one of the Japanese soldiers & love interest of Lola Gretchen when she was young.
Maricar Reyes as Young Gretchen - love interest of Ichiro.
Mariel Rodriguez as Varga - When Kapitan Boom meets her in his finale story & she begins her story

Trivia
Jay-R Siaboc sings the theme song for Kapitan Boom.
Along with the weekly "Mars Ravelo's Komiks presents Kapitan Boom" of ABS-CBN, GMA also airs another Mars Ravelo daily classic telefantasya, "Dyesebel". These shows from Ravelo are broadcast for the first time in 2008.

See also
Isang Lakas
List of Komiks episodes

References

External links
 Official website Kapitan Boom Drama
 Kapitan Boom at Telebisyon.net
 Kapitan Boom Blog Catalog

2008 Philippine television series debuts
2008 Philippine television series endings
Philippine drama television series
Television series by Dreamscape Entertainment Television
Fantaserye and telefantasya
Television shows based on comics
ABS-CBN original programming
Filipino-language television shows